Fernando Domínguez Cunchillos (born 10 June 1953) is a Navarrese politician, Minister of Health of Navarre from July 2015 to August 2019.

References

1953 births
Government ministers of Navarre
Geroa Bai politicians
Living people
Politicians from Navarre